Sar Tol-e Dowlatabad (also Romanized as Sar Tol-e Dowlatābād; also known as Sar-e Tol and Sar Tol) is a village in Ahmadabad Rural District, in the Central District of Firuzabad County, Fars Province, Iran. At the 2006 census, its population was 692, in 150 families.

References 

Populated places in Firuzabad County